Andrea Bovo (born 14 May 1986) is an Italian footballer who plays for Nocerina in Serie D.

Biography
Born in Mestre, the mainland part of Venice (Italian: Venezia) municipality, Bovo started his career at Serie B side A.C. Venezia. After he made his first team debut in 2nd half of 2003–04 season, he was signed by Serie A side Palermo in a co-ownership deal but loaned back to Venice. Palermo got the remain registration rights after the bankrupt of AC Venezia and loaned him to Serie C1 side Salernitana.

In the next season, he left for Serie B side Bari on loan. But he just played once in the league on 19 February 2006, replaced Ivan Rajčić against Rimini, which the match ended in 2–2 draw.

Padova
In January 2007 he left for Serie C1 side Padova in another loan deal, there he started to play as a regular starter.

In summer 2007, Padova signed Bovo's 50% registration rights after the co-ownership deal was accepted, for €250,000. In June 2008, Padova bought the rights from Palermo after won the auction, for €426,000. He won promotion playoffs to Serie B in 2009.

Spezia
On 27 June 2012 Bovo was signed by Spezia Calcio.

Pescara
On 31 January 2014 he was signed by Pescara.

Salernitana
On 9 October 2014 he was signed by Salernitana as a free agent.

Serie C clubs
On 4 August 2016 he joined Serie C club Reggiana for an undisclosed fee.

On 22 August 2018 he joined Serie C club Viterbese.

On 31 January 2019 he signed with Vicenza Virtus.

On 24 July 2019, he signed with Virtus Francavilla. On 31 January 2020, he was loaned to Siena.

On 5 October 2020 he moved to Juve Stabia.

Serie D
On 9 September 2021, he joined Nocerina in Serie D.

International career
Bovo was capped for Italy U17 team at 2003 UEFA European Under-17 Football Championship. He also played at Italy U19 team at 2005 UEFA European Under-19 Football Championship qualification.

References

External links
 Profile at FIGC 
 Profile at AIC.Football.it 
 Profile at La Gazzetta dello Sport 2006-07 
 

Italian footballers
Serie B players
Serie C players
Serie D players
Venezia F.C. players
Palermo F.C. players
U.S. Salernitana 1919 players
S.S.C. Bari players
Calcio Padova players
Spezia Calcio players
Delfino Pescara 1936 players
A.C. Reggiana 1919 players
U.S. Viterbese 1908 players
L.R. Vicenza players
Virtus Francavilla Calcio players
A.C.N. Siena 1904 players
S.S. Juve Stabia players
A.S.D. Nocerina 1910 players
Association football midfielders
Footballers from Venice
1986 births
Living people